La Pobla de Montornès is a village in the province of Tarragona, in the autonomous community of Catalonia, Spain.

References

External links
 Government data pages 

Municipalities in Tarragonès
Populated places in Tarragonès